Wynantskill is a census-designated place (CDP) in Rensselaer County, New York, United States. The population was 3,276 at the 2010 census.  Wynantskill is located at the northern town line and the northeastern corner of the town of North Greenbush. The community is a suburb of Troy. state route 66 (Pawling Ave. in Troy, Main Ave. in Wynantskill) is the main route through the community. Wynantskill has a major grocery store, several banks and restaurants, a craft beverage store, convenience stores, a post office, and a bowling alley, with almost all houses located on side streets off Main Ave. Other major roads are Whiteview Road (NY 136), a primarily residential road that leads to US 4; and West Sand Lake Road (NY 150).

Geography
Wynantskill is located at  (42.692139, -73.644580).

Location

Demographics

As of the census of 2000, there were 3,018 people, 1,246 households, and 857 families residing in the CDP. The population density was 1,245.1 per square mile (481.5/km2). There were 1,284 housing units at an average density of 529.7/sq mi (204.9/km2). The racial makeup of the CDP was 97.81% White, 0.53% African American, 0.20% Native American, 0.30% Asian, 0.03% Pacific Islander, 0.03% from other races, and 1.09% from two or more races. Hispanic or Latino of any race were 0.43% of the population.

There were 1,246 households, out of which 28.3% had children under the age of 18 living with them, 55.6% were married couples living together, 10.0% had a female householder with no husband present, and 31.2% were non-families. 26.8% of all households were made up of individuals, and 16.7% had someone living alone who was 65 years of age or older. The average household size was 2.42 and the average family size was 2.94.

In the CDP, the population was spread out, with 21.4% under the age of 18, 6.5% from 18 to 24, 27.3% from 25 to 44, 25.9% from 45 to 64, and 18.9% who were 65 years of age or older. The median age was 42 years. For every 100 females, there were 90.5 males. For every 100 females age 18 and over, there were 88.4 males.

The median income for a household in the CDP was $51,988, and the median income for a family was $61,951. Males had a median income of $40,391 versus $30,086 for females. The per capita income for the CDP was $23,277. About 0.4% of families and 1.3% of the population were below the poverty line, including none of those under age 18 and 1.8% of those age 65 or over.

Schools
Wynantskill is served by the Wynantskill Union Free School District, home to the K-8 Gardner-Dickinson Elementary/Middle School, but contains no high school.  Most children from Wynantskill attend high school at nearby Troy High School, in the Averill Park Central School District, the Brunswick (Brittonkill) Central School District, or the East Greenbush Central School District.  Students also have the option to attend Tech Valley High School.

At present time, the District is in solid academic and financial standing.

See also
Kill (body of water)

References

Census-designated places in New York (state)
Census-designated places in Rensselaer County, New York
Hamlets in North Greenbush, New York